Karl Andre Vallner (born 28 February 1998) is an Estonian professional footballer who currently plays as a goalkeeper for Meistriliiga club FCI Levadia and the Estonia national team.

International career
Vallner made his senior international debut for Estonia on 8 January 2023, in a 1–1 draw against Iceland in a friendly.

Honours

Club
FCI Levadia
Meistriliiga: 2021
Estonian Cup: 2020–21
Estonian Supercup: 2022

References

External links

1998 births
Living people
Estonian footballers
Association football goalkeepers
Footballers from Tallinn
Esiliiga B players
Esiliiga players
Meistriliiga players
JK Tallinna Kalev players
FCI Levadia Tallinn players
Estonia youth international footballers
Estonia under-21 international footballers
Estonia international footballers